Chinot railway station is located in Chiniot, Punjab, Pakistan on the Sangla Hill–Kundian Branch Line.

See also
 Chiniot
 Chiniot District

References

External links

Railway stations in Chiniot District